Mărișelu is a commune in Bistrița-Năsăud County, Transylvania, Romania. It is composed of seven villages: Bârla (Berlád), Domnești (Bilak), Jeica (Zselyk), Măgurele (Serling), Mărișelu, Nețeni (Nec) and Sântioana (Sajószentiván).

Natives
Martin Abern (1898–1949), American Marxist politician
Dorel Zegrean (born 1969), Romanian footballer

References

Communes in Bistrița-Năsăud County
Localities in Transylvania